The women's downhill competition of the Beijing 2022 Olympics was held on 15 February, on the "Rock" course at Yanqing National Alpine Ski Centre ski resort in Yanqing District. Corinne Suter of Switzerland, the reigning world champion, won the event, which was her first Olympic medal. Defending champion Sofia Goggia of Italy won silver, and Nadia Delago of Italy took bronze, also her first Olympic medal.

Defending silver medalist Ragnhild Mowinckel competed, but bronze medalist Lindsey Vonn had retired from competition. Prior to the Olympics, six World Cup downhill events were held; Goggia was leading the ranking, followed by Suter and Ramona Siebenhofer.

Qualification

Results
The race started at 11:30 local time, (UTC+8), delayed a half hour due to gusting winds.

References

Women's alpine skiing at the 2022 Winter Olympics